Moose Blood were an English emo band based in Canterbury, Kent. They formed in 2012 and were signed to Hopeless Records.

History
Moose Blood formed in August 2012 and published a self-released demo, Bukowski Demo (Summer '12), in the same month. The group's line-up consisted of Eddy Brewerton on vocals and guitar, Mark E. Osbourne on guitar, Kyle Todd on bass and Glenn Harvey on drums. On 11 February 2013, an EP, Moving Home, was released through Fist in the Air. "Boston" and "Orlando" were released together as a single through Venn Records on 26 April. The band released a split EP with Departures through No Sleep on 12 November. On 16 April 2014, it was announced that the band had signed to No Sleep and would release their debut album later in the year. In May, the band supported I Am the Avalanche on their tour of the UK. Their debut album I'll Keep You in Mind, From Time to Time charted at number 45 on the US Billboard Top Heatseekers chart. They played on the 2015 Warped Tour.

Moose Blood announced in January 2016 that they would be touring the UK throughout April 2016, supported by The Winter Passing and Greywind. The tour - which would include headline shows at venues such as the O2 Academy Islington in London, and Joiners in Southampton - ended up selling out before it had begun. Moose Blood announced, via their Facebook and Twitter accounts, on 13 April that they had signed to Hopeless Records for their second album. On 17 April that the first single titled "Honey" was played on the Radio 1 Rock Show as the Rockest Record. Eddy also announced that the new album would be released on 5 August and would be titled Blush.

In March 2017, Moose Blood announced the departure of drummer Glenn Harvey in the wake of sexual harassment allegations. Harvey was alleged to have sent an unsolicited image to a woman during 2015.

In April 2018, Movements dropped off a tour supporting Moose Blood over the band's sexual misconduct allegations. On 24 September 2018, Moose Blood was announced as support for Good Charlotte's headline tour across Europe and the UK, but Good Charlotte removed them hours later after fan backlash over Moose Blood's sexual misconduct allegations. Following their removal from the Good Charlotte tour, Moose Blood announced a hiatus, citing that "it has been a traumatic past year."

On 3 May 2021, Mark Osborne and Lee Munday announced a new band Hurtless that also features Brian MacDonald from PVRIS. Lee's Instagram post included the caption "Moving on..." hinting at a full break up for Moose Blood. The next month Hurtless released their debut single, Slower.

Reception
Moose Blood has been described as emo, pop punk and emo pop. Their 2013 EP Moving Home is "like a combination of Brand New's Deja Entendu, The Get Up Kids' Something to Write Home About and American Football's self-titled."

Members

Current
 Eddy Brewerton – vocals, rhythm guitar (2012–2018)
 Mark E. Osbourne – lead guitar, vocals (2012–2018)
 Kyle Todd – bass (2013–2018)
 Lee Munday – drums (2017–2018)

Former
 Glenn Harvey – drums (2012–2017)
 Sam Bradford – bass (2012–2013)

Timeline

Discography

Studio albums
 I'll Keep You in Mind, From Time to Time (2014)
 Blush (2016)
 I Don't Think I Can Do This Anymore (2018)

Compilation appearances
 "I Don't Love You" (2016)
 My Chemical Romance cover on Rock Sound Presents: The Black Parade album

Awards

Kerrang! Awards

|-
| 2016
| "Honey"
| Best Track
| 
|}

References

External links 

 Official Website

Musical groups established in 2012
Musical groups from Kent
Hopeless Records artists
2012 establishments in England
No Sleep Records artists